Dar Kola (also Romanized as Dār Kolā; also known as Dārāb Kolā and Dārā Kolā) is a village in Pain Khiyaban-e Litkuh Rural District, in the Central District of Amol County, Mazandaran Province, Iran. At the 2006 census, its population was 539, in 140 families.

References 

Populated places in Amol County